Events in the year 2018 in Tajikistan.

Incumbents
President: Emomali Rahmon
Prime Minister: Kokhir Rasulzoda

Events
29 July - Terrorist attack against cyclists in Tajikistan

Sports 
9 to 18 March – Tajikistan participated at the 2018 Winter Paralympics in PyeongChang, South Korea.
18 August to 2 September - Tajikistan will participate at the 2018 Asian Games in Indonesia

Deaths

1 May – Bozor Sobir, 79, poet, laureate of the Rudaki Prize.
18 May – , poet (b. 1932)

References

 
2010s in Tajikistan
Years of the 21st century in Tajikistan
Tajikistan
Tajikistan